Arampampa is a small town in Bolivia, capital of the Bernandino Bilbao province to the north of the Department of Potosí. In 2010 it had an estimated population of 55.

References

External links
 
 

Populated places in Potosí Department